The Kemin Range (or Kemin-Too) is a mountain range in the north Tien-Shan, a southern branch of the Trans-Ili Alatau. It stretches for 36 km from southeast to northwest between the valleys of the rivers Kichi-Kemin (river) and Tegirmenti, left tributary of the Chong-Kemin. The mountains are largely composed of granite slabs, granite-gneiss, granite-pegmatites and other rocks formed in the beginning of Proterozoic. The eastern part of the range features the Alpine relief: the crests are high and rocky with traces of ancient glaciation. The western part is mountainous. Northern and southern slopes are limited by tectonic faults. Flat crests and denudation plains are among distinguishing features. Steppe and meadow-steppe ( - ), shrub meadows ( - ), sub-Alpine and Alpine meadow ( -  msl), and nival-glacial belt (above ) are characteristic landscapes.

References

Mountain ranges of Kyrgyzstan